Tute Bianche was a militant Italian social movement, active from 1994 to 2001.
Activists covered their bodies with padding so as to resist the blows of police, to push through police lines, and to march together in large blocks for mutual protection during demonstrations.

Name
Tute Bianche means, "White Overalls". The name stems from an early demonstration (initiated by a loose group of Italian anti-globalization activists called the Ya Basta Association), involving the group defense of a squatted social center (CSOA), in which demonstrators wore white overalls to evoke the "ghosts" that would haunt the ghost town police proposed to make of the social center. The padding tactic, adopted later, is also referred to as a padded bloc tactic. It was first used in September 2000 by other activists during the anti-globalization protests in Prague.

"If the struggle aims at achieving visibility, the colour of the fight is white, and the white garment covers the whole body."

Activity
Central to the Tute Bianche movement was the Italian Ya Basta Association, a network of groups throughout Italy that were inspired by the Zapatista Army of National Liberation uprising in Chiapas in 1994. Ya Basta primarily originated in the "autonomist" social centers of Milan, particularly Centro Sociale Leoncavallo. These social centers grew out of the Italian Autonomia movement of the 1970 and 80s.

The Tute Bianche philosophy was based on a specific reading of Italian political / social history, including the idea that the traditional protest tactic of marching and "bearing witness" to power had outlived its usefulness, and a more confrontational, militant form of non-violent protest was required to not only re-invigorate the anti-globalization movement, but redefine how street resistance is understood.

The Tute Bianche movement reached its apex during the anti-G8 protests in Genoa, in July 2001, with a turn-out of an estimated 10,000 protesters in a single "padded block", after a collective decision to go without the white overalls. Shortly after Genoa the Ya Basta Association disbanded, with certain segments reforming into the "Disobbedienti" ("Disobedients"). This philosophy includes the occupation and creation of squatted self-managed social centers, anti-sexist activism, support for immigrant rights and refugees seeking political asylum, as well as the process of walking together in large formations during demonstrations held in the streets, by force if necessary in case of clashes with police.

The Tute Bianche have had international variations of one sort or another. For instance, in Britain a group calling itself the WOMBLES (White Overalls Movement Building Libertarian Effective Struggles) adopted the tactics. In Spain, "Mono Blanco" was the preferred identifier. The first North American variant of the Tute Bianche, the NYC Ya Basta Collective (based in NYC) wore yellow overalls, rather than white.

See also 
 Anti-globalization movement

External links
Tute Bianche: The practical side of myth making by Wu Ming
Tute Bianche
NYC YaBasta Collective
El movimiento de los tute bianche. Experiencias y estrategias, by Pablo Iglesias Turrión
Multitud y acción colectiva postnacional: un estudio comparado de los desobedientes: de Italia a Madrid (2000-2005), PhD by Pablo Iglesias Turrión
 From Tute Biance to the Book Bloc, Francesco Raparelli, 2011
[https://www.youtube.com/watch?v=_e14T1OH418&t=833s Disobbedienti (2002), a film by Dario Azzellini & Oliver Ressler, 54 min.

References

Autonomism
Political organisations based in Italy